Electric board may refer to:
 Electricity board, which governs one or more electric utilities
 Electric skateboard